Charlotte Clayton, Baroness Sundon (11 December  1679 – 1 January 1742) was a British Lady in Waiting. She is known as the influential favourite of queen regent Caroline.

Life
Charlotte Dyve was the daughter of John Dyve, clerk of the Privy Council and Frances Wolseley, and granddaughter of Sir Lewis Dyve of Bromham in Bedfordshire. She married William Clayton, a Treasury official, at some date before 1715. In 1735 she became Lady Sundon when her husband was made first Baron Sundon. They had no children.

Charlotte Clayton was a woman of the bedchamber to Queen Caroline from 1714 until 1737. She enjoyed a lot of influence with the Queen, who served as regent during the king's absence, and she was mistrusted by Robert Walpole who suspected that it was her opinions that were making the Queen uncooperative in state affairs. It was alleged that she even proposed that she and Walpole could rule the country. The Queen's death was a great blow to her, and in her last years, she was afflicted with a painful tumour as well as (according to gossip) bouts of insanity.

References

1742 deaths
British ladies-in-waiting
Irish baronesses
Women of the Bedchamber
Year of birth uncertain
British and English royal favourites
Court of George II of Great Britain